George Savvides  (born 20 October 1956) is an Australian businessman and chairman of the Special Broadcasting Service (SBS). Between 2002 and 2016 he was the Managing Director of Medibank Private Limited.

Education
George Savvides is the son of Greek Cypriot parents who arrived in Australia in 1950.  He was the first person in his family to go to university. He trained as an industrial engineer and has a Bachelor of Engineering (Honours) from the University of New South Wales.  While working full-time he obtained a Master in Business Administration from the University of Technology, Sydney, which included a final year thesis on the Japanese TQM & Lean manufacturing process.

Career
In 1992, he was CEO at Smith & Nephew Australia/New Zealand (a UK-based global healthcare company), and BOC (British Oxygen Co.) In 1996, he led Sigma Company Ltd, then a private cooperative supplying pharmacists, through six major acquisitions and then in late 1999 into public ownership and listing on the Australian Stock Exchange. After a short stint as Managing Director of Healthpoint Technologies Limited in 2002  he was appointed to the board of Medibank Private as a non-executive director on 6 September 2001 and was appointed Managing Director on 19 April 2002. He joined the organisation at a time when it was making a significant loss ($175 million for 2001-02), but by 2004-05 had turned that around to a record profit ($130.8 million).

He was a Councillor of the Australian Health Insurance Association (AHIA) and the International Federation of Health Plans, and Director of the Australian Centre for Health Research Limited (ACHR). He was also a Director of World Vision Australia (board member 1998 to 2011) and World Vision International (board member between 2001-2011). He chaired the Stewardship Committee (Finance Committee) and was a member of the World Vision International Executive Committee.
He is a Fellow of the Australian Institute of Company Directors.

On 21 October 2015 he announced his retirement from Medibank, to take effect at the end of March 2016.

He was appointed to the Special Broadcasting Service (SBS) Board as Deputy Chair in March 2017, and on 9 July 2020 it was announced that he had been appointed as Chair for a period of five years.

Personal
He married in November 1979. He and his wife Vivian have sponsored, starting when they married, many children through World Vision. They are committed Christians and are involved in the NewPeninsula Baptist Church where he chairs the Board. His philosophy is that "the expression of our faith was never meant to be divorced from the world of work".  He refers to the workplace as "the vineyard we have been called to work in where faith and work are not separated".

He enjoys fast boats and has played hockey since his childhood. He played for the Melbourne University Hockey Club Blues Veterans team until 2016.

Savvides was made a Member of the Order of Australia in the 2020 Australia Day Honours for "significant service to the community, to charitable groups, and to business."

References

Living people
1956 births
Australian chief executives
Australian Anglicans
Australian people of Greek Cypriot descent
University of Technology Sydney alumni
Fellows of the Australian Institute of Company Directors
Members of the Order of Australia